The 1964 United States Senate election in Nevada was held on November 3, 1964. Incumbent Democratic U.S. Senator Howard Cannon won re-election to a second term by a slim margin of only 48 votes.

As of 2021, this remains the closest Senate race in US history since the passing of the 17th amendment in which the winner was seated as Senator.

General election

Candidates
Howard Cannon, incumbent U.S. Senator since 1959 (Democrat)
Paul Laxalt, Lieutenant Governor of Nevada and former Ormsby County District Attorney (Republican)

Results

Notes

References

Nevada
1964
1964 Nevada elections